
The Avia BH-6 was a prototype fighter aircraft built in Czechoslovakia in 1923. It was a single-bay biplane of unusual configuration, developed in tandem with the BH-7, which shared its fuselage and tail design.

Development
The BH-6 had wings of unequal span, but unusually, the top wing was the shorter of the two, and while it was braced to the bottom wing with a single I-strut on either side, these sloped inwards from bottom to top. Finally, the top wing was attached to the fuselage not by a set of cabane struts, but by a single large pylon.

The BH-6 crashed early in its test programme, and when the related BH-7 did also, both implementations of this design were abandoned.

Specifications

See also

References

 
 
 Němeček, V. (1968). Československá letadla. Praha: Naše Vojsko.
 airwar.ru

1920s Czechoslovakian fighter aircraft
BH-06
Single-engined tractor aircraft
Biplanes